In the run up to the 2013 Portuguese local elections, various organisations carried out opinion polling to gauge voting intention in several municipalities across Portugal. Results of such polls are displayed in this article. The date range for these opinion polls are from the previous local elections, held on 11 October 2009, to the day the next elections were held, on 29 September 2013.

Polling

Alcobaça

Aveiro

Barcelos

Batalha

Braga

Bragança

Cascais

Chaves

Cinfães

Coimbra

Covilhã

Évora

Faro

Felgueiras

Funchal

Golegã

Gondomar

Guarda

Guimarães

Leiria

Lisbon

Loures

Lousada

Marinha Grande

Matosinhos

Mogadouro

Oeiras

Ourém

Paços de Ferreira

Paredes

Penafiel

Pombal

Porto

Porto de Mós

Santa Cruz

Santa Maria da Feira

Santarém

Santo Tirso

São João da Madeira

São Pedro do Sul

São Vicente

Sintra

Vale de Cambra

Valongo

Viana do Castelo

Vila Nova de Famalicão

Vila Nova de Gaia

Vila Real

Vinhais

Viseu

References

Notes

External links 
 ERC - Official publication of polls
 2013 local election results
 2009 local election results

Opinion polling in Portugal